Fujiwara no Otomuro (藤原乙牟漏; [ɸu͍ʑiwaɽa no otomuɽo], 760 – April 28, 790) was a Japanese noblewoman and Empress consort of Japan. Her sister was Fujiwara no Moroane.

Fujiwara no Otomuro was a daughter of a noble called Fujiwara no Yoshitsugu; her mother was the granddaughter of general Fujiwara no Umakai, who died in 737.

She married Emperor Kanmu. Their children included:
Emperor Heizei
Emperor Saga

She also had a daughter, Princess Koshi.

Her daughter-in-law was Lady Tachibana no Kachiko.

Notes

Fujiwara clan
Japanese empresses
760 births
790 deaths
8th-century Japanese women
Emperor Kanmu